Dean Brotherston (born 1 September 1997) is a Scottish footballer who plays for Dalbeattie Star in the Lowland league.

Predominately a striker during his career, Brotherston has previously played for Queen of the South in the Scottish Championship.

Career
A product of the Queen of the South youth system, Brotherston scored his first goal for the club on 17 September 2016 in a 3–1 league victory over Raith Rovers. He went on loan to Lowland Football League club, Dalbeattie Star in early 2017 to gain more first-team experience, but was released by Queens in May 2017, having played in ten league matches and scoring one goal. In June 2017, Brotherston signed for Sunshine George Cross in Melbourne, Australia. After rejoining Dalbeattie on his return from Australia, Brotherston signed for Forfar Athletic on amateur terms in March 2018, making one appearance before the end of the season.

Brotherston signed for Dalbeattie Star in July 2018 for his third spell at the club but moved on to Cumnock Juniors two months later. Brotherston resigned for Star for the 2019-20 season.

References

External links

1997 births
Living people
Association football forwards
Scottish footballers
Queen of the South F.C. players
Dalbeattie Star F.C. players
Caroline Springs George Cross FC players
Forfar Athletic F.C. players
Cumnock Juniors F.C. players
Scottish Professional Football League players
Scottish Junior Football Association players
Scottish expatriate footballers
Expatriate soccer players in Australia
Scottish expatriate sportspeople in Australia